Bruchia may refer to:
 Bruchia (beetle), a genus in the tribe Chalepini
 Bruchia (plant), a moss genus in the family Bruchiaceae